Olive Township is one of the fifteen townships of Noble County, Ohio, United States.  The 2000 census found 5,395 people in the township, 3,429 of whom lived in the unincorporated portions of the township.

Geography
Located in the south central part of the county, it borders the following townships:
Center Township - northeast
Enoch Township - east
Jefferson Township - southwest corner
Jackson Township - south
Sharon Township - west
Noble Township - northwest

Most of the village of Caldwell, the county seat and by far the biggest village of Noble County, is in northern Olive Township.  A small corner of the village of Dexter City is also in the township's far southeast.

Name and history
Statewide, the only other Olive Township is in Meigs County.

Government
The township is governed by a three-member board of trustees, who are elected in November of odd-numbered years to a four-year term beginning on the following January 1. Two are elected in the year after the presidential election and one is elected in the year before it. There is also an elected township fiscal officer, who serves a four-year term beginning on April 1 of the year after the election, which is held in November of the year before the presidential election. Vacancies in the fiscal officership or on the board of trustees are filled by the remaining trustees.

References

External links
Noble County Chamber of Commerce 

Townships in Noble County, Ohio
Townships in Ohio